Periklis Kakousis (1879 – 1939) was a Greek weightlifter who competed in the 1904 Summer Olympics and in the 1906 Summer Olympics. At the 1904 Olympics he won a gold medal in the two hand lift event. Two years later he finished sixth in the two hand lift competition at the 1906 Intercalated Games.

References

External links
profile
Mention of Perikles Kakousis' death 

1879 births
1939 deaths
Greek male weightlifters
Olympic weightlifters of Greece
Weightlifters at the 1904 Summer Olympics
Weightlifters at the 1906 Intercalated Games
Olympic gold medalists for Greece
Olympic medalists in weightlifting
Medalists at the 1904 Summer Olympics
Olympic tug of war competitors of Greece
Tug of war competitors at the 1904 Summer Olympics
People from Aegina
Sportspeople from Attica
20th-century Greek people